Gerrit Bol (May 29, 1906 in Amsterdam – February 21, 1989 in Freiburg) was a Dutch mathematician who specialized in geometry. He is known for introducing Bol loops in 1937, and Bol’s conjecture on sextactic points.

Life
Bol earned his PhD in 1928 at Leiden University under Willem van der Woude. In the 1930s, he worked at the University of Hamburg on the geometry of webs under Wilhelm Blaschke and later projective differential geometry. In 1931 he earned a habilitation.

In 1933 Bol signed the Loyalty Oath of German Professors to Adolf Hitler and the National Socialist State.

In 1942–1945 during World War II, Bol fought on the Dutch side, and was taken prisoner. On the authority of Blaschke, he was released. After the war, Bol became professor at the Albert-Ludwigs-University of Freiburg, until retirement there in 1971.

Works

References 

M. Barner, F. Flohr, Commemorating Gerrit Bol, Freiburg University leaves 104, 1989, pp. 10f.
Hala Pflugfelder Orlik: Historical notes on loop theory, Commentationes Mathematicae Universitatis Carolinae 41, 2000, pp. 359–370 (online: cmuc0002.htm)

External links 

1906 births
1989 deaths
20th-century Dutch mathematicians
Differential geometers
Dutch expatriates in Germany
Group theorists
Leiden University alumni
Scientists from Amsterdam
Academic staff of the University of Freiburg